Vοud (Greek: Βούδ) is a neighbourhood in the central part of the city of Patras, 1 km direct and 500 m via road from the downtown core.  Voud is linked with Lontou Street.

Nearest neighbourhoods
Vlatero, north?
Psilalonia, south?
Skagiopouleio?

Streets

Lontou Street?

Information
Today in the neighbourhood features Voud Square, in the area around 1850, it had a villa owned by the English grape trader Thomas William Wood (1816-1894) in which he moved to Patras in 1834.  In the villa features ancient artifacts and busts of Artemis (4th century BC) and Iacchos (2nd century AD), etc. The ancient council was donated by Frederick Wood in the Archeological Museum of Patras.

Geography
Its geography is in a hilly setting and are residential, the forests are founded to the north.

History
The area were made up of farmlands until when housing developments arrived in the late-19th and the early-20th centuries.  It were made up of neoclassical buildings.  After World War II and the Greek Civil War, they were replaced with six to eight story buildings which covers much of the area, but several neoclassical buildings remain today.  Traffic lights were installed in the 1970s.

References
Triantafyllou, Istoriko lexiko ton Patron (Ιστορικό λεξικό των Πατρών = The Patras Historic Dictionary), Patras 1995, Volume I, pg. 340.
The first version of the article is translated and is based from the article at the Greek Wikipedia (el:Main Page)

Neighborhoods in Patras